Anna Mackmin (born 1964) is a British theatre director. She has been an associate director at the Sheffield Crucible and at the Gate Theatre in London.

Early life and education 
Mackmin was born in Leeds. Mackmin's sister, Scarlett Mackmin, is a choreographer also working in the London theatre.

Mackmin attended the Central School of Speech and Drama, studying acting.

Career 
Dissatisfied with her acting career, she became a clothing designer at one point and set up a business with her sister in London's Soho neighbourhood. Mackmin was friends with the actress and writer Charlotte Jones, and it was Jones' first play Airswimming which also provided Mackmin with her directorial debut in 1997.

She had only done two plays when Michael Grandage offered her the position of associate director at the Crucible Theatre in Sheffield. There she scored notable successes with Arthur Miller's The Crucible and Caryl Churchill's Cloud Nine, the latter earning her the 2004 TMA Award for best director. She has also had a successful stint at the Gate Theatre, where her most recent directorial effort was Ibsen's Ghosts.

Mackmin has repeatedly worked with Charlotte Jones since their joint debut, directing Jones' plays In Flame, The Dark and The Lightning Play. She has also collaborated several times with Amelia Bullmore whom she originally directed as an actress in The Crucible in 2004. Since then, she has directed Bullmore's play Mammals and also her adaptation of Ghosts.

In 2006, Mackmin staged an acclaimed triple bill at the National Theatre, entitled Burn/Chatroom/Citizenship. In the spring of 2007, she again won plaudits, this time for her direction of Dying For It, Moira Buffini's 'free adaptation' of Nikolai Erdman's The Suicide.

Mackmin directed Toby Stephens as Henry in a revival of Tom Stoppard's The Real Thing at the Old Vic Theatre in London from April through June 2010.

Filmography 
Actor
 1992: Coronation Street – 1 episode as Sister Lancaster
 1993: Minder – 1 episode as Receptionist
 1993: The Chief – 2 episodes as June Robbins
Director
 2004: The Crucible by Arthur Miller at the Sheffield Crucible (Sheffield)
 2005: Breathing Corpses by Laura Wade at the Royal Court Theatre (London)
 2005: Mammals by Amelia Bullmore at the Bush Theatre (London)
 2006: Burn / Chatroom / Citizenship at the National Theatre (London)
 2007: Ghosts by Henrik Ibsen (adaptation) at the Gate Theatre (Dublin)
 2009: 24 Hour Plays, The Old Vic (London)
 2009: Dancing at Lughnasa by Brian Friel at The Old Vic (London)
 2010: The Real Thing by Tom Stoppard at The Old Vic (London)
 2010: Really Old, Like Forty Five by Tamsin Oglesby at The National Theatre (London)
 2010: Me And My Girl by Noel Gay at the Sheffield Crucible
 2012: Hedda Gabler by Henrik Ibsen at The Old Vic (London)
 2011: Di and Viv and Rose by Amelia Bullmore at Hampstead Downstairs (London)
 2013: Di and Viv and Rose by Amelia Bullmore at Hampstead Theatre (London)
 2015: Di and Viv and Rose by Amelia Bullmore at Vaudeville Theatre (London)

Bibliography 
 Devoured (Propolis, 2018)

References 

 Interview with Whatsonstage.com

External links 
 

British theatre directors
Alumni of the Royal Central School of Speech and Drama
Living people
1964 births
Date of birth missing (living people)
People from Leeds
Film people from Yorkshire